Christian Keyes (born July 24, 1975) is an American actor and model.  Born in Detroit, MI but raised in Flint, MI, Christian got his start in the entertainment industry by appearing in stage plays having since graduated to television and film. Since his introduction as an actor he has added singer, author and producer to his resume. He describes his ethnicity as a combination of African American (father) and Native American/French (mother). Keyes has one son named Christian Keyes, Jr.

Life and career
Keyes was born in Detroit and raised in Flint. He began his career appearing on stage productions and also worked as model and   fitness trainer.  comedy-drama film.  On television, he has had guest starring roles on Brothers & Sisters, Moonlight, Family Time, Beauty and the Beast, Instant Mom, Mistresses and Born Again Virgin. From 2011 to 2014, Keyes had a recurring role in the BET comedy series Let's Stay Together. Keyes made an appearance on the CW hit show “Supernatural”, playing the character Michael the Archangel. He also appeared in Keri Hilson's music video "Energy", "The Way That I Love You" by Ashanti, "In the Morning" by Ledisi, "Suitcase" by Mary J. Blige playing love interests.

Keyes has appeared in several films and made-for-television movies, include leading roles in Perfect Combination (2010), Lord, All Men Can't Be Dogs (2011) alongside Vivica A. Fox, Note to Self (2012), Act Like You Love Me (2013) and The Man in 3B (2015).  He also appear in Tyler Perry's stage plays including Madea Goes to Jail and What's Done in the Dark.

In 2016, Keyes was cast as male lead alongside Vanessa Bell Calloway, Gloria Reuben, Jasmine Burke and Clifton Powell in the Bounce TV prime time soap opera, Saints & Sinners. In 2018, Keyes starred on BET drama series In Contempt as Charlie Riggs. In January 2020, it was announced that he had been cast in the role of Ripley Turner on The Young and the Restless.

Filmography

Film and TV Movies

Television

Discography

References

External links
 

•

1975 births
African-American male actors
American male television actors
American male film actors
Native American male actors
21st-century American male actors
Living people
Male models from Michigan
Male actors from Detroit
21st-century American singers
21st-century American male singers
20th-century African-American male singers
21st-century African-American male singers